The following is a list of songs by the Korean girl group T-ara.

List of songs

 

 
T-ara